Jahnna N. Malcolm is the pen name of Jahnna Beecham, born March 30, 1953, in Wichita, Kansas, and Malcolm Hillgartner, born February 4, 1952, in Indianapolis, Indiana. They are American authors of over 130 works of juvenile and young adult fiction, most notably the series "The Jewel Kingdom" (Scholastic, 1997), and "Bad News Ballet" (Scholastic, 1989). They also wrote the best-selling juvenile horror books "Scared Stiff" (Scholastic, 1991) and "Scared to Death" (Scholastic, 1992). They have won several awards including a Parent's Choice award. Their books have been translated into French, Italian, Indonesian, Polish, Spanish and Norwegian.

Background 

Jahnna Beecham and Malcolm Hillgartner met in 1978, when they were actors with the Oregon Shakespeare Festival in Ashland, Oregon. They were married March 2, 1981, on the stage of the Empty Space Theatre in Seattle, Washington. Robert Fulghum, author of “Everything I Need to Know I Learned in Kindergarten” and a Unitarian minister, performed the ceremony. Throughout their lives they have continued to work in regional and international theatre as actors, directors, and playwrights. Malcolm is also a well received audiobook narrator.
Beecham wrote her first book, “See the USA With Your Resume” (published by Samuel French in 1983) with Zoaunne LeRoy and Adale O’Brien. She and Malcolm began their writing collaboration while Jahnna was writing five Sweet Dreams romances (Cloverdale Press, published by Bantam). When Scholastic published Beecham and Hillgartner’s first book series written together, Bad News Ballet, they chose the pen name Jahnna N. Malcolm, because as Hillgartner said (quotation cited): “That’s what everyone calls us. And it’s easier for kids to remember one name.”

Beecham and Hillgartner have a son, Dashiell, born in Salem, Virginia in 1989, and a daughter, Skye, born in Kalispell, Montana in 1991. Their parenting experiences resulted in the humorous parenting column, The Jahnna and Malcolm Show: A Family Journal, which appeared weekly in Sesame Street Parents Magazine and CTW Online in 1999. The columns were eventually combined in the book “I'm Counting to 10...” (Sorin Books, 2001), which won a Parent's Choice Silver Honor in 2001.
Since 1994 they have lived in southern Oregon, where they continue to write books for readers of all ages and musicals. Their musicals, Chaps! (1995) and Dog Park: The Musical (2008, book and lyrics by JNM with Michael J. Hume; songs by Malcolm Hillgartner) are published by Samuel French. Their most recent musical, Holmes and Watson Save the Empire (book and lyrics by JNM; songs by Malcolm Hillgartner) premiered at the Milwaukee Repertory Theater, Wisconsin on November 14, 2009.

Awards 

Burbank International Children's Film Festival 2001: Best Drama- “The Ruby Princess Runs Away”
Parent’s choice 2001: Non-Fiction Silver Honor- "I’m Counting to Ten…"
Audiofile Earphones award: Malcolm Hillgartner's narration of "Cheever: a Life" by Blake Bailey

Book Series 

Bad News Ballet (Scholastic)
 Drat! We're Rats!, original title, The Terrible Tryouts (1989)
 Battle of the Bunheads (1989)
 Stupid Cupids (1989)
 Who Framed Mary Bubnik? (1989)
 Blubberina (1989)
 Save D.A.D. (1990)
 Camp Clodhopper (1990)
 The King and Us (1990)
 Boo Who? (1991)
 A Dog Named Toeshoe (1990)

Hart & Soul (Bantam Books)
 Kill the Story (September, 1989)
 Play Dead (September, 1989)
 Speak No Evil (July, 1990)
 Get the Picture (August, 1990)
 Too Hot to Handle (July, 1991)
 Signed, Sealed, Delivered (July, 1991)
 House of Fear (September, 1991)
 Run for Your Life (September, 1991)

Rock ‘N Rebels (Bantam Books)
 Makin' the Grade (1991)
 Sticking Together (1991)

Rebel Angels, with Laura Young (HarperCollins)
 Rebel Angels (1996)	
 Winging It (1996)
 Fly Away Home (1996)
 Cloud Nine (1996)

The Jewel Kingdom (Scholastic)
 The Ruby Princess Runs Away (1997)
 The Sapphire Princess Meets a Monster (1997)
 The Emerald Princess Plays a Trick (1997)
 The Diamond Princess Saves the Day (1997)
 The Ruby Princess Sees a Ghost (1998)
 The Sapphire Princess Hunts for Treasure (1998)
 The Emerald Princess Finds a Fairy (1998)
 The Diamond Princess and the Magic Ball (1998)
 The Ruby Princess and the Baby Dragon (1998)
 The Sapphire Princess Helps a Mermaid (1999)
 The Emerald Princess Follows a Unicorn (1999)
 The Diamond Princess Steps through the Mirror (1999)
Super Special #1: The Jewel Princesses and the Missing Crown (1998)

The Strange Museum of Lost and Found (Hooked on Phonics—Master Reader)
 The Midnight Ride (2003)
 Pirate’s Revenge (2003)
 Men in Green (2003)
 The Royal Switch (2003)

Love Letters (Simon Pulse) 
 Perfect Strangers (2005)
 Mixed Messages (2005)
 The Write Stuff (2005)
 Message in a Bottle (2005)

Selected Single Titles 

 Scared Stiff (Scholastic: 1991)
 Scared To Death (Scholastic: 1991)
 The Slime That Ate Crestview (Scholastic: 1992)
 Freak Show (Scholastic: 1992)
 Aries: Secret Identity (HarperCollins/Zodiac: 1995)
 Taurus: Black Out (HarperCollins/Zodiac: 1995)
 Gemini: Mirror Image (HarperCollins/Zodiac: 1995)
 Cancer: Dark Shadows (HarperCollins/Zodiac: 1995)
 Leo: Stage Fright (HarperCollins/Zodiac: 1995)
 Virgo: Desperately Yours (HarperCollins/Zodiac: 1995)
 Libra: Into The Light (HarperCollins/Zodiac: 1995)
 Scorpio: Death Grip (HarperCollins/Zodiac: 1995)
 Sagittarius: Strange Destiny (HarperCollins/Zodiac: 1995)
 Capricorn: Don't Look Back (HarperCollins/Zodiac: 1995)
 Aquarius: Second Sight (HarperCollins/Zodiac: 1995)
 Pisces: Sixth Sense (HarperCollins/Zodiac: 1995)
 Spirit of the West (Grolier/Scholastic: 1996)
 Stallion of Box Canyon (Grolier/Scholastic: 1997)
 I’m Counting to 10...  (Sorin Books, 2001)

References 

The Write Stuff. Jones, Trevelyn E.; Toth, Luann; Charnizon, Marlene; Grabarek, Daryl; Raben, Dale; Black, Elaine Baron // School Library Journal;May2005, Vol. 51 Issue 5, p133 Reviews the book "The Write Stuff," by Jahnna N. Malcolm.
Christolon, Blair. "Signed, Sealed, Delivered (Book)." School Library Journal 37.1 (1991): 114.

External links 
Jahnna N. Malcolm homepage 
Goodreads - Jahnna N. Malcolm's Goodreads page

20th-century pseudonymous writers
21st-century pseudonymous writers
Writers from Wichita, Kansas
Married couples
The Baby-Sitters Club
Writing duos